

1997-98 Korać Cup season

1998-99 Saporta Cup season

1999-00 Saporta Cup season

2000-01 Suproleague season

2001-02 Saporta Cup season

2002-03 Champions Cup season

2003-04 ULEB Cup season

2004-05 ULEB Cup season

2005-06 Euroleague season

2006-07 ULEB Cup season

2007-08 Euroleague season

2008-09 Eurocup season

2009-10 Euroleague season

2010-11 Euroleague season

2011-12 Eurocup season

2012-13 Euroleague season

2017-18 Eurocup season

References 
Rosters taken from:
Archived Lietuvos rytas team page,
LKL official website (both live and archived),
BBL official website (both live and archived),
FIBA Europe website,
Eurocup official website,
Euroleague official website.

BC Rytas
Rosters